Joshua Corin is an American author and screenwriter. He is known for writing the novel Nuclear Winter Wonderland and a screenplay for the novel.  Nuclear Winter Wonderland follows the story of an underachieving college kid, Adam Weiss, whose sister Anna is kidnapped by a lunatic nuclear terrorist. Adam sets off for the terrorist, teaming up with a dyspeptic ex-mob thug and a Spanish-speaking female clown. Adam soon learns that twelve nuclear bombs placed around the world will go off at midnight on Christmas Eve.

Corin is also the author of the screenplay for Windfall, the first-place winner in the Open Door Contest.  Joshua Corin grew up in Rhode Island and went to the State University of New York at Binghamton.

External links
 

Year of birth missing (living people)
Living people
American male screenwriters
Writers from Rhode Island
Screenwriters from Rhode Island